Craig William Wilkinson (born 19 March 1963) is a former English cricketer. Wilkinson was a right-handed batsman who bowled right-arm medium pace. He was born at Wardle, Rochdale, Lancashire.

Wilkinson made his first-class debut for Leicestershire against Nottinghamshire in the 1991 County Championship at Trent Bridge. He made thirteen further first-class appearances for the county in that season, the last of which came against Kent. In his fourteen first-class matches, he took 23 wickets at an average of 43.86, with best figures of 4/59. With the bat he scored 138 runs at an average of 12.54, with a high score of 41. In that same season he made his List A debut against Derbyshire in the Refuge Assurance League at Grace Road. He made seventeen further List A appearances in that season, the last of which came against Gloucestershire in the same tournament. He took 16 wickets in his eighteen List A matches, at an average of 39.31 and with best figures of 3/16. He scored 80 runs with the bat, with a high score of 35 not out. This was the only season in which he played for Leicestershire, with Wilkinson later appearing in a single Minor Counties Championship match for Oxfordshire against Berkshire in 1995.

References

External links
Craig Wilkinson at ESPNcricinfo
Craig Wilkinson at CricketArchive

1963 births
Living people
People from Wardle, Greater Manchester
English cricketers
Leicestershire cricketers
Oxfordshire cricketers